Frontal fibrosing alopecia is the frontotemporal hairline recession and eyebrow loss in postmenopausal women that is associated with perifollicular erythema, especially along the hairline. It is considered to be a clinical variant of lichen planopilaris.

Presentation 

There is loss of both terminal and vellus hairs that occurs in a bandlike pattern on the frontotemporal scalp. It is a scarring alopecia that has been associated with facial papules, glabellar red dots, a loss of eyebrows, and prominent venous vasculature in the forehead. Facial hyperpigmentation may occur in dark-skinned patients if association with lichen planus pigmentosus is present.

Associations 

Frontal fibrosing alopecia has been most often reported in post-menopausal women with higher levels of affluence and a negative smoking history. Autoimmune disease is found in 30% of patients.

Pathogenesis 

Although the pathogenesis of frontal fibrosing alopecia is poorly understood, autoimmune reaction and hormonal factors may play a role.

Diagnostic 

Perifollicular erythema and scarring white patches are seen on dermoscopy. On scalp biopsy, lymphocytic and granulomatous perifolliculitis with eccentric atrophy of follicular epithelia and perifollicular fibrosis are visualized.

Differential diagnosis 

Important diagnoses to consider include female pattern hair loss (FPHL), chronic telogen effluvium (CTE), and alopecia areata (AA). FPHL is a non-scarring progressive miniaturization of the hair follicle with one of three different characteristic patterns. CTE is an idiopathic disease causing increased hair shedding and bi-temporal recession, usually in middle aged women. AA is an autoimmune attack of hair follicles that usually causes hair to fall out in small round patches.

Treatment 

Improvement or stabilization of the condition has been reported with topical and intralesional corticosteroids, antibiotics, hydroxychloroquine, topical and oral immunomodulators, tacrolimus, and most recently, 5α-reductase inhibitors. In one study, the use of antiandrogens (finasteride or dutasteride) was associated with improvement in 47% and stabilization in 53% of patients
 Recently, successful treatment of facial papules in patients with frontal fibrosing alopecia was described with oral isotretinoin.

See also
 Skin lesion

References

External links 

Conditions of the skin appendages